Diceratias bispinosus, commonly known as the two-rod angler, is a species of double angler, a type of anglerfish. It is endemic to the Indian and Pacific Oceans.

References

Diceratiidae
Deep sea fish
Fish described in 1887
Taxa named by Albert Günther